A triband is a vexillological style which consists of three stripes arranged to form a flag. These stripes may be two or three colors, and may be charged with an emblem in the middle stripe. All tricolor flags are tribands, but not all tribands are tricolor flags.

Design 
Outside of the name, which requires three bands of color, there are no other requirements for what a triband must look like, so there are many flags that look very different from each other but are all considered tribands.

Some triband flags (e.g. those of Croatia and Ghana) have their stripes positioned horizontally, while others (e.g. that of Italy) position the stripes vertically. Often the stripes on a triband are of equal length and width, though this is not always the case, as can be seen in the flags of Colombia and Canada. Symbols on tribands may be seals, such as on the Belizean flag, or any manner of emblems of significance to the area the flag represents, such as in the flags of Argentina, India and Lebanon.

A triband is also a tricolor if the three stripes on the flag are all different colors, rather than two being the same color. Examples of tricolor flags include those of the Netherlands and France.

Gallery

See also 

 List of flags by design

References 
Types of flags
Flags by design